The Port Davey Islands Important Bird Area comprises over 20 small, rocky islands scattered both within, and in the vicinity of, the mouth of Port Davey, an inlet on the south-west coast of Tasmania, Australia.  They all lie within the Southwest National Park and are important for breeding seabirds.

Birds
The sparsely vegetated islands, with a collective area of 163 ha, have been identified by BirdLife International as an Important Bird Area (IBA) because together they support over 1% of the world populations of short-tailed shearwaters (c. 950,000 breeding pairs), fairy prions (c. 27,000 breeding pairs), little penguins (c. 16,500 breeding pairs) and black-faced cormorants (up to 230 breeding pairs).  Pacific gulls and sooty oystercatchers also nest in the islands.

Islands

Breaksea Island group
 Breaksea Islands
 Kathleen Island
 Mavourneen Rocks

Swainson Island group
 Big Caroline Rock
 Swainson Island
 Hay Island
 Shanks Islands
 Lourah Island

Mutton Bird Island group
 South East Mutton Bird Islet
 South West Mutton Bird Islet
 Mutton Bird Island
 Sugarmouse Island
 East Pyramids
 Sugarloaf Rock
 Wendar Island
 Wild Wind Islets

Trumpeter Islets group
 The Coffee Pot
 West Pyramid
 Trumpeter Islets
 Hobbs Island

References

Important Bird Areas of Tasmania
South West Tasmania
Seabird colonies
Penguin colonies